Missa Atropos  is the sixth studio album by Norwegian rock band Gazpacho. The album was released in Norway on September 15, 2010 by HWT Records and worldwide on March 22, 2011 by Kscope.

Background
In the early days of 2010 a replacement for recently departed drummer Robert R Johansen was found in Lars Erik Asp, just in time for him to get to know the music before the second part of the "Tick Tock" tour kicks in. It was planned to again visit 6 countries in the March/April period but due to a plane tragedy in Poland giving rise to a week of mourning the Polish promoter decided to postpone the concerts planned for Poland on 16–18 April. The dates were rescheduled for September 2010. On 1 May 2010 the first concert in the U.S.A. took place as part of a prog festival at the Majestic Theater in Gettysburg Pennsylvania. For the later German/Italian festivals and the Polish gigs in September they hired a stand-in guitarist by the name of Micheal Krumins to cover for Jon-Arne following the arrival of his first child and his decision to give priority to his family. Meanwhile, in July 2010 the band announced that they should still go on without Robert Johanson and recording of the new album is almost over and it will be out by the end of the year. they also revealed the name of the album a month after that during a gig.
During the Tick Tock Tour on September gigs, pre printed copies of the new album Missa Atropos were available to the present audience. And even before the official release of the new album (November 26) it was already number 1 charted at a Dutch prog site in October and November. The new album is intended to be another album in the series of films without pictures that they started back in 2007 with "Night". In other words, a concept album intended to give the listener a chance to take some time off from the world.
In December 2010, Gazpacho brought the news that they have licensed "Missa Atropos" to Kscope in the UK. They will have the rights to the album worldwide. The new album was accompanied by a 12 gig tour in 5 different countries in January / February 2011.

Story

The story of the album is about Atropos goddess of fate and destiny in Greek mythology, one of the Moirai. The Story goes on when Atropos decided to choose the mechanism of death instead of mortality and ended their life cutting their thread with her special scissor which they call it "Abhorred Shears". She wasn't all alone in this, her other two sister; Lachesis and Clotho helped her. Clotho was the youngest of all sisters and Lachesis was the kindest one. But as Atropos was so inevitable and hard she used her power to convince them to help her to destroy mortality.
They say Atropos was jealous of her sisters because they were deciding for humans' lives. Clotho was responsible for spinning the thread of human life and Lachesis was the apportioner, deciding how much time for life was to be allowed for each person or being.  She measured the thread of life with her rod. She is also said to choose a person's destiny after a thread was measured. In Greek mythology, it is said that she appears with her sisters within three days of a baby's birth to decide its fate. In between all these Atropos was the only one who should have sat somewhere and watches her youngest sisters doing their jobs, so that's when her jealousy overcame her feelings and made her to choose the mechanism of death, then she would have been a part of this circle to end humans' lives on certain time which Lachesis decides.
 The album characterizes a person who becomes trapped in a lighthouse after leaving the earth. He tries to fight against his destiny, which Atropos and her other two sisters decided for him but he finds out he can't overcome his destiny so he starts writing his "Will to Live". And in the end when he's dying, he's saying his last words in "An Audience" that he feels Atropos is standing next to him and she's ready to cut his thread of life and finish him. But we find out that this person was in love with Atropos and he was waiting for his time to come, which Atropos comes along then he can see her face and say goodbye to this world. That's when he starts describing beauty of Atropos to his only audience that was watching him dying, which is a "Snail" and asking that snail to describe Atropos' beauty to anyone he see.

Critical reception

The album mostly received positive reviews. Website Prog Archives gave a positive review to the album and awarded it with 4 star out of 5 and called it: "Excellent addition to any prog rock music collection." Craig Hartranft of Dangerdog Music Reviews gave 3 and half star out of 5 to the album and wrote: "This work is both hard and hearty to digest. It's progressive, art, and alternative at its best with a dark sense." and described the album as "dark, despondent, but artfully creative progressive rock." Jerry Ewing of Classic Rock Prog gave very positive review to the album and wrote: "A delightfully mellifluous selection. They won’t be Norway’s best kept secret much longer".

Track listing

Personnel
Credits confirmed by Allmusic:
Instruments and Performance credits
Jan Henrik Ohme - Vocal
Thomas Andersen - Keyboards
Mikael Krømer - Violin, Mandolin
Kristian Olav Torp - Bass
Jon-Arne Vilbo - Guitar
Lars Erik Asp - Drums
Technical and production
Mats 'Limpan' Lindfors - Mastering

Release history

References

2010 albums
Concept albums